Heaven & Hell was a British-American heavy metal supergroup active from 2006 to 2010, featuring guitarist Tony Iommi, bassist Geezer Butler, vocalist Ronnie James Dio and drummer Vinny Appice.

The four members of Heaven & Hell recorded and toured together as Black Sabbath from 1980 to 1982, and 1991 to 1992. Dio had replaced founding Black Sabbath vocalist Ozzy Osbourne and Appice had replaced founding drummer Bill Ward. The decision to call the group Heaven & Hell was made to differentiate the project from the Osbourne-led Black Sabbath line-up. The name of the group is derived from the 1980 album Heaven and Hell, the first Black Sabbath album to feature Dio as vocalist.

After Heaven & Hell reunited to record three new songs for the 2007 compilation album, Black Sabbath: The Dio Years, they embarked on a 2007–2008 tour. According to Iommi, the name change was made to avoid confusion between the two different line-ups of Black Sabbath, so that fans at concerts "would not expect to hear 'Iron Man' and 'War Pigs' and all that... it's none of the old stuff, it's none of the Ozzy period. It's all Dio stuff. So by calling ourselves Heaven & Hell, it's revisiting that period."

The group released one new studio album in 2009, and disbanded following Dio's death from stomach cancer in 2010.

History

Formation and early days (2005–2006)
In an October 2005 interview with the programme "Masters of Rock", aired on BBC Radio 2, Ronnie James Dio revealed his plans to work with Black Sabbath guitarist Tony Iommi once again. He stated that two songs would be penned, and were to feature on a "project" entitled Black Sabbath – The Dio Years. Black Sabbath bassist Geezer Butler and drummer Bill Ward were initially named as the rhythm section completing the project.  At Iommi's behest, the group rebranded themselves Heaven & Hell to differentiate this incarnation from the Osbourne-fronted Black Sabbath which was then only on a hiatus. However, for The Dio Years – for which the band would end up recording three new songs rather than two – the band continued to use the Black Sabbath name.

Ward, who performed on the 1980 Heaven and Hell album and the first half of the tour, ultimately declined to be the band's drummer before they recorded, citing musical differences. His departure made way for a reunion of the other Dio-fronted Black Sabbath line-up which included journeyman drummer Vinny Appice.  Appice had replaced Ward midway through the original Heaven and Hell tour in 1980, and he remained the Black Sabbath drummer for two years coinciding with Dio's tenure in the band from 1980 to 1982, and again when Dio reunited with the band in 1991 and 1992. He also backed the Osbourne-led version of the group briefly in 1998 while Ward was ill.

Following the recording of three new tracks for Black Sabbath – The Dio Years, the group embarked on a 2007 tour.  This tour was voted "Comeback of the Year" at the Classic Rock Roll of Honour Awards by readers of Classic Rock.

The Devil You Know (2007–2009)

Initially, the members had stated that their 2007 tour was a one-off and had expressed their intentions to go their separate ways at its conclusion. Dio planned to return to his eponymous band to produce Magica II and Magica III, sequels to their 2000 album Magica, while Appice would continue with his project 3 Legged Dogg. However, in a March 2007 interview, Dio and Iommi stated that while they were both tied to separate contractual commitments in 2008, neither would discount the possibility of future collaborations; six months later, the band members announced their decision to continue their collaboration and record and release a new album. In August, they took part in the Metal Masters Tour alongside Judas Priest, Motörhead and Testament.

On 28 April 2009, the band released the studio album The Devil You Know, containing the single "Bible Black".  The subsequent promotional tour, the Bible Black Tour, spanned from 5 May to 29 August and featured supporting act Coheed and Cambria.  It saw stops at the Sweden Rock Festival, the Hellfest in France, the Wâldrock Festival in the Netherlands, the Wacken Open Air and the Sonisphere Festival in Knebworth, UK.  The tour's final show in Atlantic City, New Jersey, USA would prove to be Dio's final public performance.

Dio's death and break-up (2009–2010)
In November 2009, Dio was diagnosed with stomach cancer. Prognoses were initially favourable, however, and the band planned further activity following a brief period of rest for the singer.  They were slated to tour in support of Iron Maiden in Europe from July to August, but the tour was cancelled on 4 May due to Dio's ill health. Dio died from this illness on 16 May 2010 at 67 years old.

The three surviving members performed a final Heaven & Hell set in tribute to Dio at the High Voltage Festival on 24 July 2010 with two guest vocalists: former Black Sabbath and Deep Purple vocalist Glenn Hughes and Norwegian singer Jørn Lande of Masterplan fame. Former Pantera and Down vocalist Phil Anselmo also made a brief appearance in the song "Neon Knights". All of the proceeds from the event went towards the Ronnie James Dio Stand Up and Shout Cancer Fund.   The posthumous live album Neon Nights: 30 Years of Heaven & Hell was released on 16 November, recorded in Germany at the Wacken Open Air festival on 30 July 2009.

In March 2011, after Heaven & Hell's dissolution, Appice joined Kill Devil Hill along with former Pantera and Down bassist Rex Brown. In November 2011, Iommi and Butler reactivated Black Sabbath with original vocalist Ozzy Osbourne, announcing plans for a world tour and new record with producer Rick Rubin the following year. The resulting album 13 was released in June 2013.

Band members

Ronnie James Dio – lead vocals, keyboards (2006–2010) (died 2010)
Tony Iommi – guitar (2006–2010)
Geezer Butler – bass (2006–2010)
Bill Ward – drums, percussion (2006)
Vinny Appice – drums, percussion (2006–2010)

Live musicians
Scott Warren – keyboards, guitar (offstage) (2007–2010)
Jørn Lande – vocals (2010)
Glenn Hughes – vocals (2010)

Discography

Live albums

Discography as Black Sabbath

References

External links

Official website archived at the Wayback Machine
2009 live review

2006 establishments in California
2010 disestablishments in California
English heavy metal musical groups
Heavy metal supergroups
Musical groups established in 2006
Musical groups disestablished in 2010
Musical quartets
Black Sabbath
American heavy metal musical groups